This is a listing of the horses that finished in either first, second, or third place and the number of starters in the Hollywood Futurity, an American Grade 1 race for three-year-olds at 1-1/16 miles on synthetic surface held at Hollywood Park in Hollywood, California.  (List 1973–present)

References 

Horse races in California
Hollywood Park Racetrack
Flat horse races for two-year-olds
Grade 1 stakes races in the United States